The New 1017 Records, also known as 1017 Global Music, LLC and formerly 1017 Brick Squad, So Icey Entertainment, & 1017 Eskimo, is an American record label founded by Gucci Mane after his departure from Mizay Entertainment and the closing of So Icey. The label's most successful artists include Mane, Waka Flocka Flame, Pooh Shiesty, Big Scarr and OJ da Juiceman.

History

2007–2013
In 2007 Gucci Mane founded his first independent record label, So Icey Entertainment, after signing with Mizay Entertainment. Soon after Gucci released his independent album, Trap-A-Thon. 

From 2007 - 2009, So Icey Entertainment flooded the streets and online streaming platforms with mixtapes. These early years of internet mixtapes would change independent music forever, paving the way for platforms like YouTube, Soundcloud, and Audiomack. Gucci, along with his independent label, So Icey Entertainment, is also responsible for birthing legendary trap music names such as DJ Drama. 

On May 4, 2010, he announced that he was closing So Icey Entertainment and leaving Mizay Entertainment due to business concerns with Debra Antney. 

Gucci Mane then stated that he was starting his own record label (1017 Brick Squad) and that his employer, Jerry Alvarado, was already signing a distribution deal with Asylum Records

While still signed to Mizay Entertainment, OJ Da Juiceman and Waka Flocka Flame were the first artists signed to 1017 Brick Squad

Juiceman's debut album was unofficially released through the 1017 Brick Squad record label (it was officially released through Asylum Records and Mizay Entertainment). The first mainstream success for 1017 Brick Squad occurred in 2009, when Gucci released The State vs. Radric Davis.

In 2010, Brick Squad artist Waka Flocka Flame released his debut album, Flockaveli, through Brick Squad, Mizay Entertainment, and Warner Bros.

On September 28, 2010, Gucci Mane released his seventh studio album, The Appeal: Georgia's Most Wanted.

On December 16, 2011, while preparing for a music video at an Atlanta recording studio, Brick Squad artist Slim Dunkin was shot and killed while arguing with another person in the building, later identified as Atlanta rapper Young Vito.

On February 25, 2013, Young Vito was acquitted of murdering Slim Dunkin, but he was given a 25-year sentence for aggravated assault and possession of a firearm.

2013–2016
On March 15, 2013, via Twitter, Gucci Mane tweeted that he "dropped" Waka Flocka Flame and that Waka was no longer a member of 1017 Brick Squad.

The next day, Gucci's management claimed his Twitter account was hacked and he did not send the tweet about Waka Flocka.

However, Waka would claim this to be false and later diss Gucci Mane at a Dipset reunion concert in New York City. On March 27, 2013, Waka told MTV that it would be impossible for him to be dropped from 1017 Brick Squad as he owns stake in the company. He also confirmed that there was indeed a feud going on between the rappers and "they would never make music or do business together again."

On September 7, 2013, various members of 1017 Brick Squad and Brick Squad Monopoly argued back and forth on Twitter. This was the culmination of a label-wide communication breakdown and spawned Brick Squad Mafia, the label run by Mack Drama which is where Frenchie, along with a multitude of other Brick Squad Artists, first ended up after splitting from the primary group.

Gucci Mane would go on to say "fuck brick squad" and accuse his former manager, Waka Flocka's mom Debra Antney, of stealing money from OJ da Juiceman and Frenchie. Frenchie also accused Gucci Mane of paying for Young Vito's lawyer, the accused murderer of former 1017 Brick Squad artist Slim Dunkin, which Gucci denied. Then Frenchie released a diss record toward Gucci the following day.

2016–present
Upon Gucci Mane's latest release from incarceration, he created a new record label, 1017 Eskimo, a partnership venture with Alamo/Empire Distribution. Artists signed to 1017 Eskimo included Hoodrich Pablo Juan and Lil Wop. In 2020, Gucci rebranded his label as 1017 Global Music, LLC, and partnered up with Atlantic to distribute music for his signees. He released a compilation album called Gucci Mane Presents: So Icy Summer in July 2020 introducing his artists. He and his label mates released So Icy Gang Vol.1 in October 2020.

Discography

Studio albums 
So Icey Entertainment

1017 Brick Squad

1017 Records

Collaborative albums

Compilation albums 
1017 Brick Squad

1017 Records

Mixtapes 
So Icey Entertainment

1017 Brick Squad

1017 Records

Notes

Notable artists

Current
Gucci Mane
Foogiano
Pooh Shiesty
BigWalkDog

Former
Big Scarr (deceased)
Waka Flocka Flame
OJ da Juiceman
Frenchie
Young Thug
Yung Mal
Asian Doll
Hoodrich Pablo Juan
Young Scooter
OG Boo Dirty
Peewee Longway
Migos
Lil Wop
Chief Keef
Yung Beef

References

External links
Official website

2007 establishments in Georgia (U.S. state)
American independent record labels
Companies based in Atlanta
Gangsta rap record labels
American hip hop record labels
Labels distributed by Warner Music Group
Record labels established in 2007
Contemporary R&B record labels
Databases